We Cut Corners are an Irish indie rock duo from Dublin.

Career
John Duignan and Conall Ó Breacháin met in college. They founded We Cut Corners in 2011. Their influences include Ryan Adams, Vampire Weekend and Leonard Cohen.
Their first three studio albums were all nominated for the Choice Music Prize.

Personnel
John Duignan (guitar, vocals)
Conall Ó Breacháin (drums, vocals)

Discography

Albums
 Today I Realised I Could Go Home Backwards (2011)
 Think Nothing (2014)
 The Cadences of Others (2016)
 Impostors (2018)

References

External links 
Official page

2011 establishments in Ireland
Male musical duos
Irish musical duos
Irish indie rock groups